Thimayya & Thimayya is a 2022 Indian Kannada-language family drama film directed by Sanjay Sharma and starring Anant Nag and Diganth in the titular roles.

Cast 
Anant Nag as Sr. Thimayya 
Diganth as Jr. Thimayya
Aindrita Ray as Jyotsana 
Shubra Aiyappa as Soumya
Vineeth 'Beep' Kumar as Andy 
Prakash Thuminad as Jaganna
Rukmini Vijayakumar (cameo appearance)

Production 
A father and son who reopened a thirty-five year old café in Goa inspired the two lead characters of a grandpa and grandson. The film is set in Coorg and Madikeri.

Reception 
A critic from The Times of India wrote that "Thimayya and Thimayya are a visual treat. Both Diganth and Anant Nag have performed their roles with ease and won big in emotional scenes". A critic from Bangalore Mirror wrote that "It is worth a watch, if you are a hard core fan of Anant Nag". A critic from The New Indian Express wrote that "To sum it all up, Thimayya & Thimayya is definitely an ideal family watch". A critic from OTT Play wrote that "Thimayya & Thimayya is a feel-good film, and the gut feeling is that it is the kind of movie that audiences would love to see as a lazy Sunday watch, but in the comfort of their homes".

References